The 5th Reserve Officers' Training Corps Brigade is an Army Reserve Officers' Training Corps brigade based at Fort Sam Houston, Texas.

Battalions

Arizona 
 Arizona State University
 Embry–Riddle Aeronautical University, Prescott
 Northern Arizona University
 University of Arizona

Arkansas 
 Arkansas State University
 University of Arkansas
 University of Arkansas at Pine Bluff
 University of Central Arkansas

Colorado 
 Colorado State University
 University of Colorado at Boulder
 University of Colorado at Colorado Springs

New Mexico 
 New Mexico State University
 University of New Mexico

Oklahoma 
 Cameron University
 Northeastern State University
 Oklahoma State University
 University of Central Oklahoma
 University of Oklahoma

Texas 
 Prairie View A&M University
 Saint Mary's University
 Sam Houston State University
 Stephen F. Austin State University
 Tarleton State University
 Texas A&M University-Corpus Christi
 Texas A&M University-Kingsville
 Texas Christian University
 Texas State University
 Texas Tech University
 The University of Texas at Arlington
 The University of Texas at Austin
 University of Houston
 University of Texas at El Paso
 University of Texas - Pan American
 University of Texas at San Antonio

Utah 
 Brigham Young University
 Southern Utah University
 University of Utah
 Utah State University
 Utah Tech University 
 Utah Valley University
 Weber State University

Wyoming 
 University of Wyoming

Reserve Officers' Training Corps